Ley de Lemas is a form of the double simultaneous vote (DSV) electoral system which is, or has been, used in elections in Argentina, Uruguay, and Honduras. It is an unusual variant of open list proportional representation, and works as follows:

Each political party (or coalition, if permitted) is formally termed a lema.
Each lema might have several sublemas (candidates or lists of candidates). The actual composition of these sublemas can vary: it can be simply a pair of candidates (for election to the posts of governor and vice-governor, for example), or an ordered list of candidates to fill the seats in a legislative body.
Each party can present several sublemas to the main election.
The winning party is the one which receives the most votes after the votes won by each of its sublemas have been added together. Within this party, the winning sublema is the one which, individually, won the most votes. Once the number of votes received by each lema and sublema has been determined, seats or posts are allocated to each proportionally, typically using a system such as the d'Hondt method.

History and use 

The Lemas system was designed in 1870 by the Belgian professor Charles Borelli.

Uruguay
Lemas were introduced in Uruguay in the early 20th century when the "Lema law" introduced double simultaneous voting. It allowed for the election of the President, Chamber of Deputies and Senate by casting a single vote. Parties acted as lemas, while party factions formed sublemas. Voters would vote for a sublema of a party, with the totals of sublemas totalled to establish the winning party.

During periods in which a presidential system was enacted (as opposed to the collegiado system that operated between 1918 and 1933 and 1951 and 1966), the presidential candidate of the sublema in the winning party with the most votes would become president.

This system was abolished for presidential elections after constitutional reforms were passed in a 1996 referendum, restricting each party to a single presidential candidate. Department elections still use the old system.

The parliamentary and department elections still use double simultaneous voting.

Honduras
Honduras applied the Ley de Lemas in the 1985 presidential election, when, due to factionalism within the two dominant parties, both were unable to elect a single presidential candidate.

Argentina
In Argentina, a number of provinces employ or have employed a version of this electoral system. 
Currently, this law is in the provinces of Formosa, Misiones and Santa Cruz. Provinces have complete freedom to elect local and national representatives using the method of their choice; the system propagates down to the municipal level (except in the hypothetical case of autonomous cities).

The lemas system has never been used in Argentina for a presidential election, though the idea was circulated before the 2003 election. In the wake of Fernando de la Rúa's resignation in the wake of the 2001 riots, original plans called for a permanent successor to be elected in 2002 under the lemas system.

Support 

The Ley de Lemas presents itself as a solution to the problem of fiat selection of candidates performed behind closed doors by party factions. By allowing many candidates to run within the same party and leaving the decision to the citizenry, the system is supposed to end the practice of dark intra-party alliances and add transparency to the conflicts between internal factions. This helps the participation of independent candidates without support from powerful party figures. It also avoids primary elections (which, in the case of Argentina, had never been practiced widely during the 20th century and typically enjoyed very low voter turnout).

Criticism 

The party-list proportional representation system works under the assumption that the citizens vote primarily for parties. However, citizens often place emphasis on individual candidates rather than the parties' perceived ideological platforms. (This is especially true of Argentina.) The diversity of views allowed within a single party means that voters may end up indirectly giving their vote to a candidate that the voters do not really support. A party that decides to present multiple candidates, either with similar or opposing ideologies, may win even if the elected candidate had few votes compared with all the other candidates. For example, in the 1971 Uruguayan presidential election, Juan Maria Bordaberry won the presidency despite finishing over 60,000 votes behind Wilson Ferreira Aldunate. However, in that election, candidates from Bordaberry's Colorado Party won 12,000 more votes between them than the candidates from Aldunate's National Party.

Also, proportional representation systems are intended for multiple winnersfor example, candidates to fill a legislative chamberbut the Ley de Lemas has been used to elect single winners (presidents, governors and mayors).

References

See also
Elections in Argentina
Elections in Honduras
Elections in Uruguay

Electoral systems
Elections in Honduras
Elections in Argentina
Elections in Uruguay